Whose Line Is It Anyway? (abbreviated to Whose Line? or WLIIA) is a short-form improvisational comedy radio programme. A television series of the same name was based on it in 1988. Following the conclusion of the British run in 1998, ABC began airing a version for the United States audience.

The show consisted of a panel of four performers who create characters, scenes and songs on the spot, in the style of short-form improvisation games, many taken from theatresports. Topics for the games were based on predetermined prompts from the host.

History
The radio series consisted of six episodes, with Clive Anderson as host, with John Sessions and Stephen Fry as regulars.

Episodes

References

External links
 

1988 radio programme debuts
1988 radio programme endings
BBC Radio comedy programmes
British panel games
British radio game shows
1980s British game shows
Radio programs adapted into television shows
Radio game shows with incorrect disambiguation